= IIHF World Women's Challenge =

The IIHF World Women's Challenge was a women's IIHF-sanctioned tournament held for the 2002 season only. It featured national teams, and there were Division I and Division II competitions.

Division I was held in Tilburg, Netherlands from February 8–10, Division II was held from March 8–10 in Kingston, England.

== Tournament ==
=== Division I ===
8. February 2002	Denmark	1:1 (0:1, 1:0, 0:0)	France	Tilburg, Netherlands
8. February 2002	Netherlands	7:0 (1:0, 2:0, 4:0)	Hungary	Tilburg, Netherlands
9. February 2002	France	17:0 (5:0, 5:0, 7:0)	Hungary	Tilburg, Netherlands
9. February 2002	Netherlands	0:7 (0:3, 0:1, 0:3)	Denmark	Tilburg, Netherlandsbr
10. February 2002	Hungary	0:7 (0:1, 0:4, 0:2)	Denmark	Tilburg, Netherlands
10. February 2002	Netherlands	0:7 (0:3, 0:3, 0:1)	France '	Tilburg, Netherlands

Pl.		GP	W	T	L	GF–GA	Pts
1.	France	3	2	1	0	25:1	5:1
2.	Denmark	3	2	1	0	15:1	5:1
3.	Netherlands	3	1	0	2	7:14	2:4
4.	Hungary	3	0	0	3	0:31	0:6

=== Division II ===
8. March 2002	Belgium	0:2 (0:0, 0:1, 0:1)	Italy	Kingston upon Hull, England
9. March 2002	United Kingdom	5:2 (-:-, -:-, -:-)	Belgium	Kingston upon Hull, England
10. March 2002	United Kingdom	3:4 (1:3, 2:0, 0:1)	Italy	Kingston upon Hull, England

Pl.		GP	W	T	L	GF–GA	Pts
1.	Italy	2	2	0	0	6:3	4:0
2.	United Kingdom	2	1	0	1	8:6	2:2
3.	Belgium	2	0	0	2	2:7	0:4
